The  or simply Toden, is the tram network of Tokyo, Japan. Of all its former routes, only one, the Tokyo Sakura Tram, remains in service. The Tokyo Metropolitan Bureau of Transportation operates the Toden. The formal legal name is Tokyo-to Densha. Its nickname, "Toden," distinguished it from the "Kokuden" (the Japanese National Railways electrified lines).



History
However, the increase in reliance on automobile traffic resulted in reductions in ridership, and from 1967 to 1972,  of track were abandoned as the Bureau changed its emphasis to bus and subway modes of transportation.

1903: The Tokyo Horse-drawn Railway changed its motive power to electricity and, under the name Tokyo Electric Railway (or Tōden, 東電) commenced operations between Shinagawa and Shinbashi.
1903: The Tokyo Urban Railway (or Gaitetsu, 街鉄) began operations between Sukiyabashi (in Ginza) and Kandabashi.
1904: The Tokyo Electric Railway (Sotobori Line) connecting Shinbashi Station and Ochanomizu opened.
1905: The three companies published the "Tokyo Geography Education Streetcar Song" to promote knowledge of the geography of Tokyo.
1906: The three companies merged to form the Tokyo Railways.
1911: Tokyo City purchased the Tokyo Railways, established its Electric Bureau, and inaugurated the Tokyo City Streetcar (東京市電) system.
1911–1922: The streetcar network expands, with various new companies and lines serving areas in the city and to the west.
1933: The route from Shinagawa Station to North Shinagawa Station is abandoned.
1933–1943: New companies, mergers, and realignments alter the network.
1943: Tokyo City is abolished and the larger Tokyo Prefecture assumes its administrative functions. The Tokyo City Streetcar bureau becomes the Tokyo Metropolitan Bureau of Transportation.
1944: Service is stopped on nine segments.
1945–1951: During the Occupation of Japan, the network evolved slowly.
1952: The segment of the Imai Line between Higashi Arakawa and Imaibashi Stations was replaced with trolley buses.
1953, 1961: Two segments (one in Shinjuku and the other connecting Shinbashi Station and Shiodome) stop operating.
1963: In preparation for the Tokyo Olympics, two segments (Kita-Aoyama Itchome – Miyakezaka and Hanzomon – Kudanshita) cease operations. The Suginami Line (Shinjuku – Ogikubo) closes because it duplicates a line of the Eidan Subway.
1967–1972: A plan for financial restructuring is put into effect in seven stages, resulting in the closing of routes.
1974: A plan for abandoning the remaining track is cancelled. The remaining routes are consolidated into a single line, named the Arakawa Line.
1978: One-man operation begins.
1990: The 8500 Series rolling stock is introduced. It is the first new design in 28 years.
2000: A new station, Arakawa Itchūmae, opens between two existing stations.
2007: 9000 Series rolling stock was scheduled for introduction.

Former lines

This is the list of former lines, listed according to their official names. Corresponding routes are those of 1962. The first section of the lines opened in the listed opening years, while the last section of the lines closed in the listed closing years.

Routes
As of 1962, there were 41 routes in operation; the maximum for the system:

Note: Route 26 discontinued by 1952.

Rail transport in Tokyo
Tram transport in Japan
Tokyo Metropolitan Bureau of Transportation
4 ft 6 in gauge railways in Japan
Tokyo Toden